Hermann Rogalla von Bieberstein (March 12, 1823 – March 18, 1906) was a former member of the Texas legislature, he was of the Democratic Party. He was a German from what was then Brieg and the son of a Prussian royal soldier. He helped found the Latin Settlement of Texas.

References 

Democratic Party members of the Texas House of Representatives
German-American history
People from Brzeg
1823 births
1906 deaths
19th-century American politicians